Sterubin (7-methoxy-3',4',5-trihydroxyflavanone) is a bitter-masking flavanone extracted from Yerba Santa (Eriodictyon californicum) a plant growing in America.

Sterubin is one of the four flavanones identified by Symrise in this plant which elicit taste-modifying properties.  The others are homoeriodictyol, its sodium salt, and eriodictyol.

Recent research has demonstrated some neuroprotective properties of Sterubin in vitro, but more research is needed before it can be considered a true drug candidate.

References 

O-methylated flavanones
Bitter-masking compounds
Taste modifiers
Catechols